Saint-Léger-de-Linières is a commune in the Maine-et-Loire department in western France. It was established on 1 January 2019 by merger of the former communes of Saint-Léger-des-Bois (the seat) and Saint-Jean-de-Linières.

See also
Communes of the Maine-et-Loire department

References

Saintlegerdelinieres